Sergeant Mohammad Baharin bin Hamidon (born 8 November 1987) is a Bruneian international footballer who last played for Bruneian league champions MS ABDB as a midfielder.

Club career
From 2008 to 2021, Baharin played at the highest division in Bruneian football for the football team of the Royal Brunei Armed Forces' sports club, MS ABDB. He has won four league titles, six FA Cups and two Super Cups with the Armymen. Baharin scored in the final of the 2014–15 FA Cup and repeated his feat in 2016.

International career
Due to consistent performances with his club, Baharin was selected to play for the Wasps at the 2016 AFC Solidarity Cup held in Malaysia, having been on standby for the 2016 AFF Suzuki Cup qualifying matches. He made two substitute appearances in Kuching, the first in a 4–0 win over Timor-Leste on 2 November.

Honours

MS ABDB
 Brunei Super League (4): 2015, 2016, 2017–18, 2018–19
 Brunei FA Cup (6): 2007–08, 2010, 2012–13, 2014–15, 2015, 2016

References

External links

1987 births
Living people
Association football midfielders
Bruneian military personnel
Bruneian footballers
Brunei international footballers
MS ABDB players